Lists of One Day International cricketers are lists of One Day International cricket players by team.

 List of Afghanistan ODI cricketers
 List of African XI ODI cricketers
 List of Asian XI ODI cricketers
 List of Australia ODI cricketers
 List of Bangladesh ODI cricketers
 List of Bermuda ODI cricketers
 List of Canada ODI cricketers
 List of East Africa ODI cricketers
 List of England ODI cricketers
 List of Hong Kong ODI cricketers
 List of India ODI cricketers
 List of Ireland ODI cricketers
 List of Kenya ODI cricketers
 List of Namibia ODI cricketers
 List of Nepal ODI cricketers
 List of Netherlands ODI cricketers
 List of New Zealand ODI cricketers
 List of Oman ODI cricketers
 List of Pakistan ODI cricketers
 List of Papua New Guinea ODI cricketers
 List of Scotland ODI cricketers
 List of South Africa ODI cricketers
 List of Sri Lanka ODI cricketers
 List of United Arab Emirates ODI cricketers
 List of United States ODI cricketers
 List of West Indies ODI cricketers
 List of World XI ODI cricketers
 List of Zimbabwe ODI cricketers

See also
 Lists of Test cricketers
 Lists of Twenty20 International cricketers

O